Rupatali is a zone and neighbourhood under development in Barisal, Bangladesh.  The area is developed by Rupatali Housing State. Its terminal, known as Rupatali Bus Terminal, connects the city of Barisal to other districts. Rupatali's points of interests include newly built schools, shopping centres, wood and multi-stem tree markets.

See also 
 Barisal City Corporation
 Barisal District
 Barisal Division

References 

Geography of Barisal
Populated places in Barisal District